Ozancık can refer to:

 Ozancık, Çan
 Ozancık, Ortaköy